I Will Always Be Yours is a 1960 West German musical comedy film directed by Arno Assmann and starring Heidi Brühl, Hans Söhnker and Helmuth Lohner.

The film's sets were designed by the art director Rolf Zehetbauer.

Cast
 Heidi Brühl as Marianne Seibold
 Hans Söhnker as Heinrich Horstmann
 Helmuth Lohner as Klaus Stettner
 Peter Weck as Bob Lindner
 Heinrich Gretler as Moosgruber
 Hannelore Bollmann as Dinah
 Ursula Herking as Fräulein Behrend
 Klaus Havenstein as Maurer
 Trude Herr as Frieda Bollinger
 Edith Mill as Die Dame
 Fritz Böttger as Herr Blücher
 Heino Hallhuber as Ralf
 Jürgen Feindt as Fritz
 Alwy Becker as Edith
 Claus Herwig as Walter
 Hans Jürgen Diedrich as Gustav
 Ina Duscha as Inge
 Ditmar Christensen as Helmut
 Gisela Kraus as Hilde
 Heidi Fischer as Gaby
 Margrit Nefen as Mrs. Hastings

References

Bibliography 
 Bock, Hans-Michael & Bergfelder, Tim. The Concise CineGraph. Encyclopedia of German Cinema. Berghahn Books, 2009.

External links 
 

1960 films
1960 musical comedy films
German musical comedy films
West German films
1960s German-language films
Films directed by Arno Assmann
Films shot at Bavaria Studios
Bavaria Film films
1960s German films